Fairmount station is a subway station in the Francisville section of North Philadelphia, Pennsylvania. It is served by SEPTA's Broad Street Line (as a local stop) and the Broad-Ridge Spur. There are three separate platforms. The Broad-Ridge Spur and Broad Street Line (BSL) northbound platforms connect inside the faregates, but the BSL's southbound platform cannot be reached from the other two without exiting. Such a connection once existed; the sealed-off entrance can be seen at platform level heading south towards the end of the platform. Travelers wishing to switch between the Broad-Ridge Spur and the southbound BSL must connect at Girard. The Broad-Ridge Spur platform is shortened and can only accommodate short 2-car trains; the unused part of the platform is visible from passing trains and is covered in layers of graffiti. Fairmount station on the Broad-Ridge Spur has a full mezzanine concourse extending from Wallace Street to Ridge Avenue, now abandoned.

Station layout

Gallery

References

External links 

Fairmount Broad Street Line & Broad Ridge Spur station images (World NYC Subways.org)

SEPTA Broad Street Line stations
Railway stations in the United States opened in 1928
Railway stations in Philadelphia
Railway stations located underground in Pennsylvania